Siegfried Valentin (23 February 1936 – 17 December 2021) was a German middle-distance runner. He competed in the 1500 metres at the 1960 Summer Olympics and the 1964 Summer Olympics.

References

External links
 

1936 births
2021 deaths
People from Guben
Athletes (track and field) at the 1960 Summer Olympics
Athletes (track and field) at the 1964 Summer Olympics
German male middle-distance runners
Olympic athletes of the United Team of Germany